Luigi Dadaglio  (28 September 1914 – 22 August 1990) was a Roman Catholic Cardinal and Major Penitentiary of the Apostolic Penitentiary.

Early life
He was born in Sezzadio, Italy. He was educated at the Seminary of Acqui. He was ordained on 22 May 1937. From 1938 until 1942 he continued his studies at the Pontifical Lateran University where he earned a doctorate in utroque iure (in both canon and civil law). He later studied at the Pontifical Ecclesiastical Academy in Rome where from 1941 until 1943 he studied diplomacy.

Early priesthood
He joined the Vatican Secretariat of State (section of Ordinary Affairs) in 1942. He was the secretary in the nunciature in Haiti and Dominican Republic from 1946 until 1950 when he was promoted to be the Auditor in the apostolic delegation to the United States, until 1953. He served as auditor in Canada and in Australia also. He was transferred to be the counselor in the nunciature in Colombia from 1958 until 1960. He was in charge, provisionally, of the nunciature in Venezuela in April 1960, until he himself was named Nuncio in Venezuela on 28 October 1961.

Episcopate
He was appointed titular Archbishop of Lerus by Pope John XXIII. He was consecrated on 8 December 1961 by Amleto Giovanni Cicognani, Cardinal Secretary of State, who was assisted by Archbishop Angelo Dell'Acqua, substitute of the Secretariat of State. He attended the Second Vatican Council. He was appointed Apostolic Nuncio to Spain on 8 July 1967. He was named Secretary of the Congregation for Divine Worship and the Discipline of the Sacraments on 4 October 1980. Pope John Paul II named him Pro-Major Penitentiary on 8 April 1984.

Cardinalate
He was created and proclaimed Cardinal-Deacon of S. Pio V a Villa Carpegna in the consistory of 25 May 1985. Having been created a Cardinal he was then named full Major Penitentiary two days later. He was named Archpriest of the Basilica di Santa Maria Maggiore in 1986. He resigned the penitentiary on 6 April 1990. He died on 22 August.

Honours
 Knight Grand Cross of the Order of Civil Merit (Kingdom of Spain, 18 March 1977).
 Knight Grand Cross of the Order of Charles III (Kingdom of Spain, 20 October 1980).

References 

1914 births
1990 deaths
People from Sezzadio
20th-century Italian cardinals
Participants in the Second Vatican Council
Major Penitentiaries of the Apostolic Penitentiary
Cardinals created by Pope John Paul II
Pontifical Lateran University alumni
Pontifical Ecclesiastical Academy alumni
Apostolic Nuncios to Venezuela
Grand Cross of the Order of Civil Merit